San Miguel Panán is a municipality in the Suchitepéquez department of Guatemala. It is situated at 730 m above sea level. It contains 15,000 people. It covers a terrain of 40 km².

External links
Muni in Spanish

Municipalities of the Suchitepéquez Department